Mågålaupet (also written Magalaupet, Maglaupet og Måggålaupet) is a  long, zigzag-shaped gorge in the river Driva in Oppdal municipality in Trøndelag, Norway.

The gorge consists of a series of large interconnected giant's kettles formed by the river Driva since the last ice age.

Canyons and gorges of Norway
Landforms of Trøndelag